Commitment is a 2019 Turkish drama film directed by Semih Kaplanoğlu. It was selected as the Turkish entry for the Best International Feature Film at the 92nd Academy Awards, but it was not nominated.

Plot
New mother Aslı hires a babysitter named Gülnihal, who also has a baby of her own. Aslı soon confronts her own long-held secrets.

Cast
 Kubra Kip as Aslı
 Umut Kurt as Faruk
 Ece Yüksel as Gülnihal

See also
 List of submissions to the 92nd Academy Awards for Best International Feature Film
 List of Turkish submissions for the Academy Award for Best International Feature Film

References

External links
 

2019 films
2019 drama films
Turkish drama films
2010s Turkish-language films
Films directed by Semih Kaplanoğlu